The 2013 Asian Athletics Championships were the 20th edition of the biennial athletics competition between Asian nations. It was held at the Shree Shiv Chhatrapati Sports Complex in Balewadi, Pune, India between 3–7 July. Around 522 athletes from 42 nations competed at the event. It was the first time since 1989 that India had hosted the championships.

Prior to the competition, the election of the Asian Athletics Association president was convened in Pune. Qatar's Dahlan Jumaan al-Hamad (an IAAF vice-president) defeated the incumbent, Suresh Kalmadi of India, by a margin of 20 votes to 18. Kalmadi, on bail for corruption charges stemming from the 2010 Commonwealth Games in Delhi, did not attend the championships. The Chief Minister of Maharashtra, Prithviraj Chavan, declared the event open at the championships opening ceremony

China, the traditional regional leader at the competition, easily took the top spot in the medal rankings with sixteen gold medals and 27 medals in total. This maintained its streak as the best nation of the tournament – a run dating back to the 1983 edition. Second-placed Bahrain took five golds and fifteen medals overall (although Ali Khamis Khamis, the 400 metres runner-up, was their only native-born medallist). Japan placed third in the medal rankings with four golds and had the second greatest overall haul with 20 medals. In fifth place the hosts India had the next biggest haul, with 17 medals in total, although Saudi Arabia and Uzbekistan had a greater number of gold medals.

The overall quality of the competition was reduced as several top Asian athletes were absent. Mutaz Essa Barshim was the only Asian 2012 Olympic medallist who intended to participate, but he withdrew due to a back injury. Thirteen champions from 2011 were present and six of them (Su Bingtian, Yousef Masrahi, Dejene Regassa, Shitaye Eshete, Satomi Kubokura, and Wassanee Winatho) successfully defended their title.

A total of eight championships records were bettered at the competition: Shitaye Eshete broke the longest-standing of these by winning the women's 10,000 metres in 32:17.29 minutes, breaking Zhong Huandi's time from 1989. The organisers used a performance-based points system to assign the titles of best athlete at the championships: Saudi 400 metres champion Yousef Masrahi was the best male with 1172 points while Bahrain's steeplechase winner Ruth Jebet was the best female with 1142 points.

The Athletics Federation of India withdrew an unnamed female shot putter from their squad for a failed doping test one day before the opening of the championships.

Hosting issues
The competition was originally set to take place in Chennai, Tamil Nadu. Jayalalithaa, the Chief Minister of the state, ordered the removal of Sri Lanka from the competition on the grounds of war crimes committed during the Sri Lankan Civil War. This request was ignored by the Athletics Federation of India and in February 2013 Chennai withdrew as hosts of the championships.

The federation approached the state governments of Jharkhand and Delhi, with the venues of Ranchi and New Delhi being suggested, but both states refused the host duties. Finally, in May the Maharashtra government agreed to host the event in Pune on the same dates agreed for the Chennai event. Pune already had a suitable track and field stadium that had recently played host to the Commonwealth Youth Games in 2008. The budget given for the championships, however, was significantly reduced.

Medal summary

Men

Women

Medal table

Participating nations

 (5)
 (20)
 (5)
 (2)
 (2)
 (43)
 (17)
 (16)
 (101)
 (4)
 (20)
 (5)
 (51)
 (1)
 (24)
 (6)
 (5)
 (2)
 (4)
 (5)
 (7)
 (5)
 (2)
 (4)
 (3)
 (5)
 (5)
 (1)
 (14)
 (17)
 (14)
 (4)
 (18)
 (18)
 (3)
 (3)
 (22)
 (3)
 (5)
 (19)
 (8)
 (5)

References

Medal table
Medal Table Rankings. Athletics Federation of India. Retrieved on 2013-07-07.
Results
Final Results. Athletics Federation of India. Retrieved on 2013-07-07.

External links 
 

 
Asian Athletics Championships
Asian Championships
Athletics Championships
International athletics competitions hosted by India
Athletics Championships
Sports competitions in Pune